The Roman Catholic Archdiocese of Bangkok is a Latin archdiocese in Thailand. The bishop's seat is the is the Assumption Cathedral, Bangkok.

History 
It dates back to 1662, when the Apostolic Vicariate of Siam was created  on territory split off from the Apostolic Vicariate of Cochinchina (in Vietnam).
 
It was renamed Apostolic Vicariate of Eastern Siam (Siam Orientale) on 10 September 1841, having lost territory to establish the Apostolic Vicariate of Western Siam. On 5 May 1899 it lost more territory to establish the Apostolic Vicariate of Laos.

It was renamed Apostolic Vicariate of Bangkok on 3 December 1924.

It lost more territories: on 30 June 1930 to establish Mission sui juris of Rajaburi, on 
11 May 1944 to establish the Apostolic Vicariate of Chantaburi and on 17 November 1959 to establish the Apostolic Prefecture of Chieng-Mai, both now its suffragan.
 
On 18 December 1965, it was elevated to the rank of a Metropolitan archdiocese.

On 9 February 1967 it lost territory to establish the Diocese of Nakhon Sawan, as its suffragan.

It enjoyed a papal visit from Pope John Paul II in May 1984.

Extent 
The archdiocese covers an area of 18,831 km², and as of 2002 it is responsible for 81,646 Catholic Christians, 0.7% of the about 12 million living in the area. It covers the administrative provinces Ayutthaya, Bangkok, Nakhon Pathom, Nonthaburi, Pathum Thani, Samut Prakan, Samut Sakhon and Suphanburi; also the parts west of the Bang Pa Kong River of Chachoengsao and Amphoe Ban Na of Nakhon Nayok belong to the diocese.

Ordinaries

Apostolic Vicars of Siam
 Louis Laneau, M.E.P. (1669-1696)
 Louis Champion de Cicé, M.E.P (1700-1727)
 Jean-Jacques Tessier de Quéralay, M.E.P. (1727-1736)
 Jean de Lolière-Puycontat, M.E.P. (1738-1755)
 Pierre Brigot, M.E.P. (1755-1776), appointed Ecclesiastical Superior of the Coromandel Coast (India)
 Olivier-Simon Le Bon, M.E.P. (1776-1780)
 Joseph-Louis Coudé, M.E.P. (1782-1785)
 Arnaud-Antoine Garnault, M.E.P. (1786-1811)
 Esprit-Marie-Joseph Florens, M.E.P. (1811-1834)
 Jean-Paul-Hilaire-Michel Courvezy, M.E.P. (1834-1841)

Apostolic Vicars of Eastern Siam
 Jean-Baptiste Pallegoix, M.E.P. (1841-1862)
 Ferdinand-Aimé-Augustin-Joseph Dupond, M.E.P. (1864-1872)
 Jean-Louis Vey, M.E.P. (1875-1909)
 René-Marie-Joseph Perros, M.E.P. (1909-1924)

Apostolic Vicars of Bangkok
 René-Marie-Joseph Perros, M.E.P. (1924-1947)
 Louis-August-Clément Chorin, M.E.P. (1947-1965)
 Joseph Khiamsun Nittayo (1965)

Archbishops of Bangkok
 Joseph Khiamsun Nittayo (1965-1972)
 Cardinal Michael Michai Kitbunchu (1972-2009)
 Cardinal Kriengsak Kovitvanit (2009–present)

Coadjutor Bishops
 Jean-Jacques Tessier de Quéralay, M.E.P. (1717-1727)
 Pierre Brigot, M.E.P. (1755)
 Olivier-Simon Le Bon, M.E.P. (1764-1776)
 Esprit-Marie-Joseph Florens, M.E.P. (1810-1811)
 Barthélemy Bruguière, M.E.P. (1828-1831), appointed Apostolic Vicar of Korea
 Jean-Paul-Hilaire-Michel Courvezy, M.E.P. (1832-1834)
 Jean-Baptiste Pallegoix, M.E.P. (1838-1841)
 Joseph Khiamsun Nittayo (1963-1965)

Province 
Its ecclesiastical province comprises the Metropolitan's own archdiocese and these five suffragan bishoprics :
 Roman Catholic Diocese of Chanthaburi
 Roman Catholic Diocese of Chiang Mai
 Roman Catholic Diocese of Chiang Rai
 Roman Catholic Diocese of Nakhon Sawan
 Roman Catholic Diocese of Ratchaburi
 Roman Catholic Diocese of Surat Thani

See also 
 Christianity in Thailand
 Roman Catholicism in Thailand
 List of Roman Catholic dioceses in Thailand
 List of Catholic dioceses (structured_view)-Episcopal Conference of Thailand
 Immaculate Conception Church, Bangkok

References

Citations

Sources 

 GigaCatholic with incumbent biography links
 catholic-hierarchy.org

External links 

  

1662 establishments in Thailand
Bangkok